The tenth season of The Real Housewives of Beverly Hills, an American reality television series, aired on Bravo from April 15, 2020, to September 23, 2020, and is primarily filmed in Beverly Hills, California.

The season focuses on the personal and professional lives of Kyle Richards, Lisa Rinna, Erika Girardi, Dorit Kemsley, Teddi Mellencamp, Denise Richards and Garcelle Beauvais. The season consisted of 20 episodes.

The seasons executive producers are Andrew Hoegl, Barrie Bernstein, Lisa Shannon, Pam Healy and Andy Cohen.

Production and crew
Alex Baskin, Chris Cullen, Douglas Ross, Greg Stewart, Toni Gallagher, Dave Rupel and Andy Cohen are recognized as the series' executive producers; it is produced and distributed by Evolution Media. The reunion for the show's tenth season was filmed in July 2020.

Cast
In June 2019, Lisa Vanderpump announced she had departed the series. All housewives of the previous season returned, along with Garcelle Beauvais joining the cast in a regular capacity, and Sutton Stracke joins the cast as a friend of the housewives. Stracke was initially set to join the cast in regular capacity; however, due to her ex-husband's refusal to allow their children to film, she was demoted. Vanderpump's departure made Kyle Richards the only remaining original cast member.

Eileen Davidson, Brandi Glanville, Camille Grammer, Faye Resnick, Kim Richards and Adrienne Maloof made guest appearances throughout the season. In September 2020, Denise Richards and Teddi Mellencamp Arroyave announced their exits from the franchise.

Episodes

References

External links

2020 American television seasons
Beverly Hills (season 10)